Pappe — , 
French (Alsatian) or Jewish last name.

 Karl Wilhelm Ludwig Pappe (1803–1862), German botanist
  (1920– 2005), Polish director of animation movies
  (born 1935), German politician
 Ilan Pappé (born 1954), Israeli historian and socialist activist
 Vadim Pappe (1942–2012), Russian art and dance historian and author